U.S. Route 71 (US 71) is a major north–south U.S. Highway that runs from Louisiana to Canada. US 71 enters Missouri from Arkansas in the town of Jane. US 71 serves the cities of Joplin, Kansas City and St. Joseph. At noon on December 12, 2012, the section of US 71 between Pineville, Missouri and Bannister Road in south Kansas City was also designated as a northern extension of Interstate 49 (I-49).

Route description

US 71 enters Missouri in Jane coming from Arkansas. A new bypass known as the Bella Vista Bypass, goes around Jane and Bella Vista, Arkansas to connect with the freeway section of US 71 near Pineville opened October 1, 2021. At this point, Interstate 49 begins its concurrency with US 71. I-49 and US 71 pass through many smaller communities before reaching Joplin. In Joplin, I-49 and US 71 interchanges with Interstate 44 and begin a short concurrency from I-44 exits 11 through 18.

A few miles east of Joplin, I-49 and US 71 leave I-44 and heads north and enters Carthage. Due to the freeway being built, old sections of the highway have been bypassed and become county roads. I-49 and US 71 pass through Nevada and other communities before reaching the Kansas City area. In south Kansas City, at Bannister Road just north of the Grandview Triangle, US 71 ends its concurrency with I-49, and continues into downtown Kansas City as Bruce R. Watkins Memorial Drive. US 71 loses its freeway status for 3 blocks in Kansas City before becoming a freeway again and entering Downtown Kansas City. It is very unlikely that the freeway will continue all the way through, as a court order prevents the stoplights to be bypassed, even though MoDOT has the necessary right of way to do so.

In northern Kansas City, US 71 shares many overlaps with interstates, including I-70, I-35, and I-29. US 71 runs with I-29 through Kansas City north of Downtown until St. Joseph.

Once in St. Joseph, US 71 leaves I-29. US 71 runs north to Maryville. US 71 serves the small community of Clearmont before running through countryside into Iowa.

History
In 1971, the highway was mostly two lanes south of Harrisonville, with the present-day bypass of Nevada and a brief segment between Butler and Rich Hill being the only other four-lane sections open between Harrisonville and Joplin. However, by the end of the decade, much of the highway would be upgraded to four lanes, with a continuous four-lane highway now existing between Kansas City and the Bates-Jasper county line. Additionally, a short segment between Carthage and Webb City (present day Route 171) had been upgraded to four lanes.

By 1987, a continuous four-lane link existed between Kansas City and Carthage, including a bypass around Carthage, as well as an upgrade of Alt. US-71 south of Carthage to I-44, creating the present-day I-49 bypass around Carthage and Joplin. Save for a four-mile section of four-lane highway south of Neosho that was completed in the 1960s, the entire portion of US-71 (including Alt. US-71) south of Joplin to the Arkansas state line remained two lanes until 1999, when the present-day expressway from I-44 south to Neosho was completed. At this time, Alt. US-71 was decommissioned entirely, with the southern segment south of I-44 replaced by Route 59. By 2004, the present-day expressway had been extended south to Pineville.

Upgrades to the highway were also made in the northern part of the state around this time, as US-71 was upgraded from two to four lanes between Savannah and Maryville, with various sections opening between 2001 and 2004.

The future of part of the Bella Vista Bypass is on hold. On August 5, 2014, voters in Missouri defeated Amendment 7 at the polls, which would have provided funding various road construction projects in the state. After the measure's defeat, the funding for the connection from the existing southern end of I-49 in Missouri along the Bella Vista Bypass to the state line is in doubt, but Arkansas is moving ahead to construct all but the last connection to the state line.
In March 2019, the Missouri Highways and Transportation Commission approved the remaining funding needed to complete the Bella Vista Bypass.  Contracts will be let in 2020. Construction began May 11, 2020 on Missouri's portion of I-49 and opened October 1, 2021.

I-435 north to I-70 west was alternate a via route for traffic to Avoid the 3 at-grade crossings.

Major intersections

See also

References

External links

 Missouri
71
Transportation in McDonald County, Missouri
Transportation in Newton County, Missouri
Transportation in Jasper County, Missouri
Transportation in Barton County, Missouri
Transportation in Vernon County, Missouri
Transportation in Bates County, Missouri
Transportation in Cass County, Missouri
Transportation in Jackson County, Missouri
Transportation in Clay County, Missouri
Transportation in Platte County, Missouri
Transportation in Buchanan County, Missouri
Transportation in Andrew County, Missouri
Transportation in Nodaway County, Missouri
Transportation in Kansas City, Missouri
Transportation in the Kansas City metropolitan area